The Billboard Top Latin Albums chart, published by Billboard magazine, is a record chart that ranks the performance of Latin music albums in the United States. The data is compiled by Nielsen SoundScan from a sample that includes music stores, music departments at electronics and department stores, Internet sales (both physical and digital) and verifiable sales from concert venues in the United States. On the week ending January 31, 2017, Billboard updated the methodology to compile the Top Latin Albums chart into a multi-metric methodology to include track equivalent album units and streaming equivalent album units.

The first number-one album of the decade was Dos Mundos: Evolución by Mexican singer Alejandro Fernández. The following number-one album was The Last by Aventura, which spent six non-consecutive weeks at the top of the chart in 2010 and ended the year as the best-selling Latin album in the United States. Euphoria, a bilingual album released by Spanish singer-songwriter Enrique Iglesias, peaked at number ten in the Billboard 200 chart and spent eleven weeks at the top of the Latin Albums chart. Iglesias earned the Latin Artist of the Year award at the 2011 Billboard Latin Music Awards, a category that combines both sales and airplay, while the aforementioned album won for Latin Album and Latin Pop Album of the Year. Also in 2010, Poquita Ropa by Guatemalan performer Ricardo Arjona debuted atop the chart and also peaked at number one in Mexico. That same year, Mexican singer-songwriter Marco Antonio Solís reached the top of the chart for the tenth time with his studio album En Total Plenitud, the most for any performer. The album received four nominations for the 12th Latin Grammy Awards.

Ricky Martin gained his sixth number-one album on the chart, Música + Alma + Sexo, in February 2011. The album also reached a peak of number three on the Billboard 200. In 2011, Mexican singer Gerardo Ortíz peaked for the first time at number one in the chart with the live album Morir y Existir: En Vivo, two weeks after surviving an ambush attempt in Mexico that left his cousin and business manager dead. Ortíz reached number one for the second time with the album Entre Dios y el Diablo, also in 2011. One notable feat that year was accomplished by Latin pop star Prince Royce, whose self-titled debut album reached the top of the chart 58 weeks after its release. Likewise in 2011, Mexican rock band Maná debuted atop the chart with their eight studio album Drama y Luz, while its lead single "Lluvia al Corazón" also debuted at number one on the Billboard Hot Latin Songs chart.

Number one albums

Key
 – Best-selling Latin album of the year

References
General

 For information about every week of this chart, follow this link; in the chart date section select a date and the top ten positions for the week selected will appear on screen, including the number-one album, which is shown in the table above.

Specific

United States Latin Albums
2010 Latin
2010s in Latin music